Tugun may refer to:

 Tugun, Coregonus tugun, a species of freshwater whitefish
 Tugun, Queensland, a suburb in the City of Gold Coast, Queensland, Australia
 Tugun or Wetarese language, of East Timor